A design engineer is an engineer focused on the engineering design process in any of the various engineering disciplines (including civil, mechanical, electrical, chemical, textiles, aerospace, nuclear, manufacturing,  systems, and structural /building/architectural) and design disciplines like Human-Computer Interaction.
Design engineers tend to work on products and systems that involve adapting and using complex scientific and mathematical techniques.  The emphasis tends to be on utilizing engineering physics and other applied sciences to develop solutions for society.

A design engineer usually works with a team of other engineers and other types of designers (e.g. industrial designers), to develop conceptual and detailed designs that ensure a product functions, performs, and is fit for its purpose. They may also work with marketers to develop the product concept and specifications to meet customer needs, and may direct the design effort. In many engineering areas, a distinction is made between the "design engineer" and other engineering roles (e.g. planning engineer, project engineer, test engineer). Analysis tends to play a larger role for the latter areas, while synthesis is more paramount for the former; nevertheless, all such roles are technically part of the overall engineering design process.

When an engineering project involves public safety, design engineers involved are often required to be licensed - for example, as a Professional Engineer (in the U.S and Canada).  There is often an "industrial exemption" for engineers working on project only internally to their organization, although the scope and conditions of such exemptions vary widely across jurisdictions.

Design engineer tasks
Design engineers may work in a team along with other designers to create the drawings necessary for prototyping and production, or in the case of buildings, for construction.  However, with the advent of CAD and solid modeling software, the design engineers may create the drawings themselves, or perhaps with the help of many corporate service providers.

The next responsibility of many design engineers is prototyping. A model of the product is created and reviewed. Prototypes are either functional or non-functional. Functional "alpha" prototypes are used for testing; non-functional prototypes are used for form and fit checking. Virtual prototyping and hence for any such software solutions may also be used. This stage is where design flaws are found and corrected, and tooling, manufacturing fixtures, and packaging are developed.

Once the "alpha" prototype is finalized after many iterations, the next step is the "beta" pre-production prototype. The design engineer, working with an industrial engineer, manufacturing engineer, and quality engineer, reviews an initial run of components and assemblies for design compliance and fabrication/manufacturing methods analysis.  This is often determined through statistical process control. Variations in the product are correlated to aspects of the process and eliminated. The most common metric used is the process capability index Cpk. A Cpk of 1.0 is considered the baseline acceptance for full production go-ahead.

The design engineer may follow the product and make requested changes and corrections throughout the whole life of the product. This is referred to as "cradle to grave" engineering. The design engineer works closely with the manufacturing engineer throughout the product life cycle, and is often required to investigate and validate design changes which could lead to possible production cost reductions in order to consistently reduce the price as the product becomes mature and thus subject to discounting to defend market volumes against newer competing products. Moreover, design changes may be also made mandatory by updates in laws and regulations.

The design process is an information intensive one, and design engineers have been found to spend 56% of their time engaged in various information behaviours, including 14% actively searching for information. In addition to design engineers' core technical competence, research has demonstrated the critical nature of their personal attributes, project management skills, and cognitive abilities to succeed in the role.

Amongst other more detailed findings, a recent work sampling study found that design engineers spend 62.92% of their time engaged in technical work, 40.37% in social work, and 49.66% in computer-based work. There was considerable overlap between these different types of work, with engineers spending 24.96% of their time engaged in technical and social work, 37.97% in technical and non-social, 15.42% in non-technical and social, and 21.66% in non-technical and non-social.

See also
Architectural engineering, also known as building engineering
Chemical engineering
Civil engineering
Electrical engineering
Industrial design engineering
Industrial engineering
Manufacturing engineering
Mechanical engineering
New product development
Production engineering
Test engineer
Tool engineering

References

Design
Design engineering
Engineering occupations